The 2006 Nordic Trophy was the first edition of the Nordic Trophy ice hockey tournament. Eight teams, four from Finland and Sweden apiece, played seven games, and the top two teams qualified for the final. Färjestad BK defeated Oulun Kärpät in the final.

First round

Final

External links
Tournament on hockeyarchives.info
European Trophy official website

Nordic Trophy
Nordic
Nordic